Rudolf Kauschka (2 October 1883, in Fukov, Bohemia – 2 April 1960, Kempten, West Germany) was a German sportsman, tourist, and mountaineer from Czechoslovakia.

Biography
He was born in 1883 in the village of Fukov, which doesn't exist anymore. The area now belongs to Šluknov. In 1895, his family moved into Bílý Potok. Kauschka completed his studies in 1904 and became a customs officer like his father. During that time, he made numerous trips and climbs in the Jizera Mountains and their surroundings. From 1906 to the end of World War II, he was a member of Liberec (Reichenberg in German) section of the Alpenverein (Alpine club in German), making many trips to the Alps. During World War I, he served as a Third Lieutenant in the first unit of mountain guides in the Ortler mountain area. From 1920 until the end of World War II, he and his friends annually visited the Lasörling area in East Tyrol, where he played a role in building the New Liberec Chalet (Neue Reichenberger Hütte in German) that opened in 1926. From 1919 until the end of World War II, he made many "first ascents" in the Jizera Mountains. In 1924, Kauschka wrote a book Wandern und Klettern. After World War II, he was expelled from Czechoslovakia. Kauschka arrived in Kempten either in 1946 or 1947 and would die there in 1960.

Sporting career
As a luger, Kauschka competed in three European luge championships, winning four medals. His first medals came at the inaugural 1914 championships in Reichenberg, Bohemia (now Liberec, Czech Republic) where he won the gold in the men's singles and a silver in the men's doubles events. Kauschka followed up with a silver in the men's singles event at Schreiberhau, Germany (now Szklarska Poręba, Poland) in 1928, then with another silver in the men's doubles event the following year in Semmering, Austria.

Tourism
Kauschka's tourism achievements were both in sports and in alpine mountaineering.

An example of this was one day, he started with friends at 2 am from Liberec to walk across Jizera Mountains to Sněžka in the Giant Mountains (located at the Czech-Polish border). 17 hours later at 7 pm, they were back in Harrachov after resting on the top of Sněžka for two hours.

In 1922, Kauschka and his friends climbed the Ještěd mountain summit twelve times starting at 7 pm one day and finishing at 5:45 pm the next day. During that day they reached an altitude over 5,000 m high, using over 20 different footpaths.

Ascents
From 1904 to 1928, Kauschka did much climbing, starting with the Jizera Mountains, including being the first to climb Zvon (a famous local rock tower) in 1921. He later climbed the Lusatian and Zittauer (part of the Breiteberg chain) mountains, Bohemian Paradise (the first ascent on Draci zub in 1906) and Saxon Switzerland (Blocksstockes). He was also in the Alps, the Dolomites (1907 – climbing the Vajolet Towers solo without a rope), Ortler (1908 – Königspitze in German), and Wallis Alps (1928 – Matterhorn, Mont Blanc).

Legacy
A rock in the Jizera Mountains, Kauschkova věž (i.e. "Kauschka's Tower"), was named in his honor.

Family
Kauschka's son Manfred was also a climber, doing the first ascent on Kobyla in Příhrazy (famous route to the local well-known sandstone tower) in 1937 with friends.

References
 Biography on Kauschka 
 P. Fajgl, O. Simm, and M. Vrkoslav (1999). Horolezecký průvodce Jizerské hory, Nakladatelství a vydavatelství Milan Vrkoslav. 
 Petr Hejtmánek, Hruboskalsko – Dračí skály, Zámecká rokle, 1996 
 Study about Kauschka 

1883 births
1960 deaths
People from Šluknov
Austrian explorers
Austrian mountain climbers
Czech mountain climbers
Czechoslovak explorers
Czechoslovak male lugers
Czechoslovak mountain climbers
German male lugers
German Bohemian people